This is a list of members of the Victorian Legislative Council from the elections of 31 August to 2 October 1858 to the elections of 31 August to 2 October 1860.

There were six Electoral Provinces and five members elected to each Province.

Note the "Term in Office" refers to that members term(s) in the Council, not necessarily for that Province.

 Hood resigned September 1859, replaced by George Ward Cole in a by-election October 1859
 McCombie resigned October 1859, replaced by Gideon Rutherford in a by-election in November 1859
 Patterson died 24 April 1859; replaced by William Mitchell around October 1859
 Tierney was unseated on grounds of inadequate property in January 1859; replaced by Niel Black in a by-election in February 1859
 Urquhart resigned March 1860, replaced by George Rolfe in a by-election in May 1860

References

 

Members of the Parliament of Victoria by term
19th-century Australian politicians